Corndon Hill is a hill in Powys, Mid Wales, whose isolated summit rises to 1,683 ft above sea level.

It is surrounded on three sides by the English county of Shropshire and forms a prominent landmark in the Wales-England border. Corndon's prominent western edge appears to form a separate hill and is known locally as Lan Fawr (Welsh: 'Big Hill'). It is frequented by walkers and ramblers from car parks nearby at Mitchell's Fold for example. There are spectacular panoramic views from the summit, and it is itself an important landmark for the surrounding countryside and towns like Montgomery. It is close to villages such as Church Stoke and Hyssington.

The hill is geologically part of the Shropshire Hills range of hills lying mainly to the north, east and south of the summit. The immediate area to the west is the Vale of Montgomery and the River Severn. The Cambrian Mountains are visible beyond to the far west. The Stiperstones and Shelve lie to the immediate north, with Caer Caradoc and the Long Mynd to the east.

Archaeology

There is a large Bronze Age cairn near the hill summit, and several more exist in the area around the summit. Such circular stone burial cairns are common on most summits in Wales and they commonly date from ca 2500 BC up until ca 700 BC, when iron slowly started to displace bronze for tools and other goods. Such cairns usually contain one or more cremation urns, and are often placed within a stone cyst or box within the mound.

The Bronze Age stone circles of Mitchell's Fold and the now largely destroyed The Whetstones lie at the foot of the hill within Shropshire and Powys respectively. There is another circle nearby in Shropshire, the Hoarstones.

The hill lies about 2 miles east of Offa's Dyke, built during the 8th century to mark the border between Wales and England (or Mercia).

Stone Axe Factory (Group XII)
In 1951 Professor F W Shotton of Birmingham University identified the source of the rock used for shafthole battle-axes, splitting mauls and axe hammers as picrite which had been quarried from Corndon Hill. Picrite is a hard volcanic or igneous rock. Production sites of stone axes and shafthole implements have been grouped by petrology and the Hyssington/Corndon Hill implements are known as Group XII. As the production of these implements in the Late Neolithic and Early Bronze Age did not employ the same flaking techniques as flint stone axes, which leave recognisable flaking debris, the site or sites of the Corndon Group XII implements production will be harder to identify. However the Clwyd-Powys Archaeological Trust did excavate several small quarry depressions in 2008, but only found evidence of fairly recent disturbance. A stone slab with striations which was suggested was an example of Neolithic art, could equally well have been early plough marks or a hone for sharpening stone edges

The main distribution of Group XII implements is in mid-Wales, the Midlands, the Cotswolds and stretching across to East Anglia. By 1988, 93 examples of these implements had been identified and all of these implements have shaftholes for hafting and there are no examples of picrite being used to produce axes.

Quarrying
The Corndon flagstone quarries are on the south western slopes of Corndon Hill and date from Medieval times. From the air the quarries are still a prominent feature in the landscape.  In this area the altered Hope Shales of the Ordovician period on the margin of the dolerite produce finely laminated flagstones which were widely used on building on the Shropshire-Montgomeryshire border. Only a few buildings still have the flagstones as roofing slates, including the Old Post Office at Church Stoke and the porch to Hurdley Farmhouse.

References

External links

www.geograph.co.uk : photos of Corndon Hill and surrounding area
guided walk from Cadw

Mountains and hills of Powys
Marilyns of Wales
Sites of Special Scientific Interest in Montgomery
Landforms of Shropshire
Mountains and hills of England